Wik Jongsma (4 April 1943 – 7 November 2008) was a Dutch film and television actor.

Early life
He was born in Amsterdam, Netherlands.

Career
Jongsma appeared in various television productions between 1976 and 2005, including appearing as Govert Harmsen in 82 episodes (1991–2005) of the soap-opera television series Goede Tijden, Slechte Tijden (in English language — Good Times, Bad Times).

He also appeared in two films.

Filmography

Death
Jongsma died in The Hague, Netherlands, age 65, after a long battle with prostate cancer.

Notes

External links
 

1943 births
2008 deaths
Deaths from prostate cancer
Dutch male television actors
Male actors from Amsterdam
Deaths from cancer in the Netherlands
20th-century Dutch people